The Caribbean Public Services Association is a trade union Federation in the Caribbean which links public sector unions in the region.

See also

 List of trade unions

Public sector trade unions
Inter-American trade union federations